Prays parilis, the lemon bud moth, is a moth of the family Plutellidae. The species was first described by Alfred Jefferis Turner in 1923. It is found in Australia (New South Wales and Queensland), New Zealand and the Cook Islands.

The larvae feed on the flowers of lemon trees and can cause fruit to become misshapen and deformed. The larvae are yellowish to reddish brown and grow up to 10 mm in length. They are most commonly found within the buds of unopened lemon flowers. Affected flowers can often be identified by the small exit hole left by larvae.

References

External links
Australian Faunal Directory
New Zealand Pest List
Common pests of citrus in home gardens

Plutellidae
Moths described in 1923